{{Infobox legislature
| background_color =Blue
| name          = Malacca State Legislative Assembly
| native_name   = ديوان اوندڠن نڬري ملاك
| coa_pic       = Coat of arms of Malacca New.svg
| session_room  = Seri Negeri Blok Laksamana.JPG
| legislature   = 15th Malacca Legislative Assembly
| house_type    = Unicameral
| houses        =
| foundation    = 1959
| preceded_by   =
| leader1_type  = Yang di-Pertua Negeri
| leader1       = Mohd. Ali Rustam
| party1        = 
| election1     = 4 June 2020
| leader2_type  = Speaker
| leader2       = Ibrahim Durum
| party2        = BN-UMNO
| election2     = 27 December 2021
| leader3_type  = Deputy Speaker
| leader3       = Khadirah Abu Zahar
| party3        = BN-UMNO
| election3     = 27 December 2021
| leader4_type  = Chief Minister 
| leader4       = Sulaiman Md Ali
| party4        = BN-UMNO
| election4     = 9 March 2020
| leader5_type  = Opposition Leader
| leader5       = Mohd Yadzil Yaakub
| party5        = PN-BERSATU
| election5     = 12 December 2022
| leader6_type  = Secretary
| leader6       = 
| party6        = 
| election6     = 
| leader7_type  =
| leader7       = 
| party7        = 
| election7     = 
| leader8_type  = 
| leader8       = 
| party8        = 
| election8     = 
| members       = 28Quorum: 9Simple majority: 15Two-thirds majority: 19
| structure1    = File:Melaka State 2021.svg
| structure1_res= 250px
| political_groups1 =
Government (26)
 BN (21)
 UMNO (18)
 MCA (2)
 MIC (1)
 PH (5)
 DAP (4)
 AMANAH (1)Opposition (2) PN (2)
 BERSATU (2)Speaker BN (non-)

| committees1    = 
| voting_system1 = Plurality: First-past-the-post (28 single-member constituencies)
| last_election1 = 20 November 2021
| next_election1 = By 25 February 2027
| meeting_place = Blok Laksamana, Seri Negeri complex, Hang Tuah Jaya, Ayer Keroh, Malacca
| website       = 
}}

The Malacca State Legislative Assembly' is the unicameral legislature of the Malaysian state of Malacca. It is composed of 28 members who are elected from single-member constituencies throughout the state. Elections are held no more than five years apart, along with elections to the federal parliament and other state assemblies (except Sarawak and Sabah).

The State Legislative Assembly convenes at the Malacca State Secretariat Building, also known as the Seri Negeri complex'' in Ayer Keroh.

Current composition

Seating arrangement

Role
The Malacca State Legislative Assembly's main function is to enact laws that apply in the state. It is also the forum for members to voice their opinions on the state government's policies and implementation of those policies. Under the Privileges, Immunities and Powers Ordinance 1963, assemblymen are given the right to freely discuss current issues such as public complaints. On financial matters, the Assembly approves supply to the government and ensures that the funds are spent as approved and in the tax-payers' interest.

The State Executive Council (EXCO) is appointed from members of the State Assembly. Led by the Chief Minister, it exercises executive power on behalf of the Governor and is responsible to the State Assembly.

Melcat
The Speaker also chairs the Malacca Committee on Competency, Accountability and Transparency (Melcat), a six-member panel consisting of state assemblymen which holds public hearings to investigate state issues. Melcat was formed when Pakatan Harapan came to power after the 2018 election.

Speakers of the Assembly
The following are the Speakers of the Malacca State Legislative Assembly since 1959:

Election pendulum
The 2021 Malacca state election witnessed 21 governmental seats and 7 non-governmental seats filled the Malacca State Legislative Assembly. The government side has 3 safe seats and 1 fairly safe seat, while the non-government side has 3 safe seats and 1 fairly safe seat.

List of Assemblies

See also
 List of State Seats Representatives in Malaysia
 State legislative assemblies of Malaysia

References

External links
 Malacca State Government official website

 
State legislatures of Malaysia
Unicameral legislatures